Thionia is a genus of issid planthoppers in the family Issidae. There are at least 70 described species in Thionia.

Species
These 76 species belong to the genus Thionia:

 Thionia acuta Doering, 1941 c g b
 Thionia anguillana Fennah, 1965 c g
 Thionia argo Fennah, 1949 c g
 Thionia bifasciatifrons Melichar, 1906 c g
 Thionia biforis (Germar, 1830) c g
 Thionia boliviensis Schmidt, 1910 c g
 Thionia borinquensis Dozier, 1931 c g
 Thionia borinqueta Caldwell & Martorell, 1951 c g
 Thionia brasiliensis Schmidt, 1910 c g
 Thionia brevifrons Schmidt, 1910 c g
 Thionia brevior Fowler, 1904 c g
 Thionia bufo Fennah, 1945 c g
 Thionia bullata (Say, 1830) c g b
 Thionia carinata Melichar, 1906 c g
 Thionia caviceps Fowler, 1905 c g
 Thionia clusiae Fennah, 1955 c g
 Thionia coriacea (Fabricius, 1803) c g
 Thionia crucifera Metcalf, 1938 c g
 Thionia dissimilis Schmidt, 1910 c g
 Thionia douglundbergi Stroinski & Szwedo, 2008 c g
 Thionia dryas Fennah, 1945 c g
 Thionia dubiosa Melichar, 1906 c g
 Thionia ecuadoriensis Schmidt, 1910 c g
 Thionia elliptica (Germar, 1830) c g b
 Thionia fowleri Metcalf, 1938 c g
 Thionia fusca Melichar, 1906 c g
 Thionia gibba Melichar, 1906 c g
 Thionia gibbicollis Dozier, 1931 c g
 Thionia herbacea (Spinola, 1839) g
 Thionia herbecea (Spinola, 1839) c g
 Thionia humilis Fowler, 1904 c g
 Thionia impressa Melichar, 1906 c g
 Thionia laodice Fennah, 1955 c g
 Thionia latifrons Melichar, 1906 c g
 Thionia longipennis (Spinola, 1839) c g
 Thionia maculata Melichar, 1906 c g
 Thionia maculipes Stal, 1864 c g
 Thionia mammifera Fennah, 1945 c g
 Thionia medusa Fennah, 1955 c g
 Thionia mexicana Melichar, 1906 c g
 Thionia minor Schmidt, 1910 c g
 Thionia musca (Uhler, 1895) c g
 Thionia naso Fowler, 1904 c g
 Thionia obrienae Wilson, 1987 c g b
 Thionia obsoleta Melichar, 1906 c g
 Thionia obtusa Melichar, 1906 c g
 Thionia ocellata Melichar, 1906 c g
 Thionia ohausi Schmidt, 1910 c g
 Thionia omani Doering, 1939 c g
 Thionia onerata Melichar, 1906 c g
 Thionia ovata Melichar, 1906 c g
 Thionia parana Bergroth, 1910 c g
 Thionia pehlkei Schmidt, 1910 c g
 Thionia pictifrons Fowler, 1905 c g
 Thionia prasina (Spinola, 1839) c g
 Thionia producta Van Duzee, 1908 c g b
 Thionia proxima Melichar, 1906 c g
 Thionia puertoricensis Caldwell & Martorell, 1951 c g
 Thionia quadratifrons Schmidt, 1910 c g
 Thionia quinquata Metcalf, 1923 c g b
 Thionia ramosi Caldwell & Martorell, 1951 c g
 Thionia rubrocostata (Spinola, 1839) c g
 Thionia schmidti Schmidt, 1910 c g
 Thionia scutellata Fowler, 1904 c g
 Thionia similis Schmidt, 1910 c g
 Thionia simplex (Germar, 1830) c g b
 Thionia sinuata Schmidt, 1910 c g
 Thionia soluta Fowler, 1905 c g
 Thionia sordida Fowler, 1904 c g
 Thionia stipes Fowler, 1905 c g
 Thionia tigrata Melichar, 1906 c g
 Thionia transversalis Melichar, 1906 c g
 Thionia truncatella Melichar, 1906 c g
 Thionia ustulipunctata (Uhler, 1876) c g
 Thionia variata Melichar, 1906 c g
 Thionia variegata Stal, 1864 c g

Data sources: i = ITIS, c = Catalogue of Life, g = GBIF, b = Bugguide.net

References

Further reading

External links

 

Issidae
Auchenorrhyncha genera